Mauricio "Mau" Vargas (born 10 August 1992) is a Costa Rican professional footballer who plays for Alajuelense.

Early life
Vargas was born in Somerville, New Jersey but moved to Alajuela, Costa Rica with his family when he was very young. He moved back to the New Jersey in his teens. He has four siblings including brothers Juan Pablo who also plays professional soccer and Mario who currently plays for CF Universidad de Costa Rica.

Club career
After moving to Costa Rica, Vargas played outfield positions for the academy of Liga Deportiva Alajuelense beginning at age 9 before becoming a goalkeeper at age 13. In 2010, he left Alajuelense and joined the academy of Albacete Balompié of the Spanish Segunda División before announcing his departure in April 2012.

At this time Vargas returned to the United States and played college soccer for the Cougars of Barton Community College. He played for the team for three years before transferring to Friends University in Wichita, Kansas and playing for its team. He graduated with a degree in physical education in 2016. During his lone season on the team, he made 16 appearances and maintained a GAA of 1.049. While at Friends University, he also played for FC Wichita of the National Premier Soccer League for the 2015 season. During the season, he made 14 appearances for the club, as he recorded 6 shutouts and maintained a .79 goals against average. That season, he also helped FC Wichita claim the NPSL South Central Conference title in the club's inaugural season. Following the season, various teams inquired about signing the player including Major League Soccer clubs Columbus Crew SC, D.C. United, FC Dallas, and Sporting Kansas City.

In December 2015 it was announced that Vargas had signed his first professional contract, joining the Pittsburgh Riverhounds of the United Soccer League. He made his professional debut for the club on 14 May 2016 in a 0–1 defeat to FC Cincinnati in front of a crowd of 23,375, a league record at that time. His performance in the match, which included saving eight of nine shots faced, earned Vargas USL Team of the Week honors.

International career
Vargas first had national team involvement with the Costa Rican youth teams at age 14. He went on to represent Costa Rica at the 2009 FIFA U-17 World Cup and the 2011 FIFA U-20 World Cup. He played every minute of every match of both tournaments. He was called into the Under-23 team in summer 2015 even though he was not of age to compete with the team. He also appeared in five matches for Costa Rica during the 2011 CONCACAF U-20 Championship.

Career statistics

Honours
Alajuelense
 Liga FPD: Apertura 2020
 CONCACAF League: 2020

References

External links
Riverhounds profile

FC Wichita profile

Friends University profile

1992 births
Living people
Costa Rican footballers
Pittsburgh Riverhounds SC players
USL Championship players
National Premier Soccer League players
Expatriate soccer players in the United States
Costa Rican expatriate footballers
Costa Rican expatriate sportspeople in the United States
Association football goalkeepers
Sportspeople from Somerville, New Jersey
Soccer players from New Jersey
Barton Community College alumni
L.D. Alajuelense footballers